Joseph Richard Starbuck (born 3 August 2002) is an English professional footballer who plays as a midfielder and full back for EFL Championship side Sheffield United.

He came through the youth academy at Grimsby Town and was promoted to the first team during the 2019–20 season before going on to make six first team appearances. He joined Sheffield United in 2021 and has largely featured for the U23's. He has since spent time on loan with Kidderminster Harriers and Boston United.

Career

Grimsby Town
After progressing through Grimsby Town's academy, on 3 September 2019, Starbuck made his debut for Grimsby in a 2–1 EFL Trophy defeat against Scunthorpe United.

Following Grimsby's relegation from the Football League at the end of the 2020–21 season, Starbuck was transfer listed by manager Paul Hurst with the player being made available subject to a sell on clause being activated in any potential deal.

Sheffield United
On 8 September 2021, Grimsby announced they had reached an agreement to let Starbuck sign for Sheffield United, where he will be featuring firstly for the Under-23 team under former Grimsby player Jack Lester.

Ahead of United's FA Cup tie with Wolverhampton Wanderers, Starbuck was called into the first team squad and given shirt number 39. He was an unused substitute in a 3-0 defeat to the Premier League side.

On 21 October 2022, Starbuck joined National League North club Kidderminster Harriers on a one-month loan deal.

On 7 December 2022, Starbuck joined National League North side Boston United on a one-month loan deal.

Career statistics

References

2002 births
Living people
Association football midfielders
English footballers
Grimsby Town F.C. players
Sheffield United F.C. players
Kidderminster Harriers F.C. players
Boston United F.C. players
English Football League players
National League (English football) players